Byron Pringle (born November 17, 1993) is an American football wide receiver of the National Football League (NFL). Pringle first played college football at Butler Community College before transferring to finish his collegiate career at Kansas State. He signed with the Kansas City Chiefs when he went undrafted in the 2018 NFL Draft.

Professional career

Kansas City Chiefs

2018
Pringle signed with the Kansas City Chiefs as an undrafted free agent in 2018. Following an injury in the Chiefs final preseason game of the 2018 season, he was placed on injured reserve on September 1, 2018.

2019
After making the Chiefs initial 53-man roster, Pringle was waived on September 10, 2019 and re-signed to the practice squad. He was elevated to the Chiefs active roster on September 14, 2019. His first big breakthrough game during Sunday Night Football against the Indianapolis Colts in Week 5, where he finished with 103 receiving yards and a touchdown as the Chiefs lost 13–19.  Pringle won Super Bowl LIV when the Chiefs defeated the San Francisco 49ers 31–20.

2020
Pringle had his first career return touchdown in Week 7, returning a kickoff 102 yards against the Denver Broncos in the 43–16 victory, earning AFC Special Teams Player of the Week. He was placed on injured reserve on November 24, 2020, after suffering an ankle injury in Week 11. He was activated on December 19, 2020. Overall, he finished the 2020 season with 13 receptions for 160 receiving yards and the kickoff return touchdown. In Super Bowl LV, he recorded Mahomes's first completion of the game for three yards. However, he was only targeted once more in the 31–9 loss to the Tampa Bay Buccaneers.

2021
The Chiefs placed a restricted free agent tender on Pringle on March 17, 2021. He signed his tender on April 29. Pringle served as a rotational wide receiver and kick returner for the Chiefs, totaling 42 receptions for 568 yards and five touchdowns during the 2021 regular season.

In the Wild Card Round against the Pittsburgh Steelers, Pringle had five receptions for 37 yards and two touchdowns in the 42–21 victory. In the Divisional Round against the Buffalo Bills, he had five receptions for 29 yards and a touchdown in the 42–36 overtime victory.

Chicago Bears
Pringle signed a one-year contract with the Chicago Bears on March 20, 2022. He was placed on injured reserve on September 27, 2022. He was activated on November 12 and played the rest of the season.

Legal issues
On April 23, 2022, Pringle was arrested for reckless driving and driving on a suspended license.

References

External links
 Kansas City Chiefs bio
 Kansas State Wildcats bio

1993 births
Living people
American football wide receivers
Butler Grizzlies football players
Kansas City Chiefs players
Chicago Bears players
Kansas State Wildcats football players
Players of American football from Tampa, Florida